Yoshikazu Iwamoto (born 1945) is a Japanese-born professional shakuhachi player living in the United Kingdom.

External links
 Biography of Iwamoto Yoshikazu at komuso.com

Japanese male musicians
20th-century Japanese musicians
Shakuhachi players
1945 births
Living people
Place of birth missing (living people)
Date of birth missing (living people)
20th-century flautists
Japanese emigrants to the United Kingdom